This is a list of members of the  New Democratic Party Shadow Cabinet of the 42nd Canadian Parliament.  Positions in the shadow cabinet were announced on November 12, 2015, and included all 44 members of the New Democratic Party caucus in the Canadian House of Commons.

Current Shadow Cabinet members

Singh II (January 31, 2018 – October 21, 2019)

Singh I (October 2, 2017 – January 31, 2018)

Mulcair II (October 19, 2016 – October 1, 2017)

Mulcair I (October 19, 2015 – October 19, 2016)

By Role

The NDP does not have a leader in the Senate of Canada as the Party has no Senators. The NDP also opposes the existence of that body.

See also
Cabinet of Canada
Official Opposition (Canada)
Official Opposition Shadow Cabinet (Canada)

42nd Canadian Parliament
Canadian shadow cabinets
History of the New Democratic Party (Canada)